Trash is a Canadian drama film, directed by Benoît Pilon and released in 2011. The film stars David Boutin as Pierre Dalpé, a formerly homeless man who has rebuilt his life with a successful trash collection business and a marriage to Madeleine (Isabel Richer), the woman who saved him from the streets; however, his fortunes begin to take a turn for the worse again after he meets Ève (Sophie Desmarais), a young drug addict living on the streets whom he tries to help in the same way.

The film began production in December 2009 in Montreal. It premiered on October 2, 2011, at the Festival International du Film Francophone de Namur, before premiering commercially in Quebec on October 21.

Kathryn Casault received a Jutra Award nomination for Best Makeup at the 14th Jutra Awards in 2012.

References

External links
 

2011 films
2010s French-language films
French-language Canadian films
Films set in Montreal
Films shot in Montreal
Canadian drama films
2011 drama films
2010s Canadian films
Films directed by Benoît Pilon